John Percival "Percy" Hagerman (October 25, 1881 – February 21, 1960) was a Canadian track and field athlete who competed in the 1904 Summer Olympics. He was born in Hamilton, Ontario. In 1904 he finished sixth in the long jump event as well as sixth in the triple jump competition. He is a member of the Occidental College Track and Field Hall of Fame.

References

External links
 John Hagerman's profile at Sports Reference.com

1881 births
1960 deaths
Athletes from Hamilton, Ontario
Canadian male long jumpers
Canadian male triple jumpers
Olympic track and field athletes of Canada
Athletes (track and field) at the 1904 Summer Olympics